Subir is a town in the Dang District of the southern part of Gujarat state in India. It is located on the Ahwa-Nawapur Road about 27 km from Ahwa. Its population consist of Mavchis, Warlis and Konkanis who live upon forest labour.

References

Cities and towns in Dang district, India